Balnagowan is a rural locality in the Mackay Region, Queensland, Australia.

History 
Balnagowan State School opened on 6 February 1950. It closed on 24 January 1977.

References 

Mackay Region
Localities in Queensland